WCT may refer to:

Sports
West Coast Trojans, a British American Football team from Scotland
World Championship Tennis, a tour for professional male players from 1967–1989
World Championship Tour surfing, a professional competitive surfing league administered by the Association of Surfing Professionals
World Chase Tag, a type of professional tag played in an obstacle course arena
World Curling Tour, an international tour for Curling

Other uses
Wall-clock time, or elapsed real time, the actual time taken from the start of a computer program to the end
WIPO Copyright Treaty, an international treaty on copyright law
West Coast Trail, a backpacking trail on Vancouver Island
Wilson's central terminal, a virtual electrode used in electrocardiography
Wonderful Christmas Time, a 1979 song by Paul McCartney
Work Capacity Test, a U.S. Forest Service physical test for wildland firefighters, also known as the "pack test"
World Confederation of Teachers, a former global union federation

See also